Richard Leroy Adams (April 8, 1920 – September 14, 2016) was an American baseball player who was first baseman in Major League Baseball, playing briefly for the Philadelphia Athletics during the  season. Born in Tuolumne County, California, he batted right-handed and threw left-handed.

Coming from a baseball family, Adams was the older brother of second baseman Bobby Adams and uncle of outfielder Mike Adams. He started his professional career in 1939 with the Cincinnati Reds affiliate Ogden Reds of the Pioneer League, spending three seasons in the minor leagues seasons before enlisting in the US Army Air Force in 1941. Discharged from the service at the end of 1945, he played and managed the Santa Ana, California Army Air Base team, for which Joe DiMaggio played.

Philadelphia Athletics (1947)
In 1946, Adams hit .330 with 155 RBI for the Wenatchee Chiefs of the Western International League, and was drafted by the Philadelphia Athletics. He remained with the Athletics for the 1947 season, appearing in 37 games. Adams posted a .202 average (18-for-89) with two home runs and 11 RBI, including nine runs, two doubles, and three triples. His first hit in the majors was a home run; Adams still has the ball from that game. Following his Major League career, Adams returned to the minors, initially with the 1948 Hollywood Stars and continued playing until 1953 finishing with the Class C Ventura Oilers of the California League.

Later life
Adams was a professional musician and led his own group during the off season of baseball. Adams died in September 2016 at the age of 96 in Fallbrook, California.

References

External links

Retrosheet

1920 births
2016 deaths
Baseball players from California
Major League Baseball first basemen
Philadelphia Athletics players
United States Army Air Forces personnel of World War II
United States Army Air Forces soldiers